The Transfăgărășan (trans + Făgăraș) or DN7C is a paved mountain road crossing the southern section of the Carpathian Mountains of Romania. It has national-road ranking and is the second-highest paved road in the country after the Transalpina. It starts near the village of Bascov, near Pitești, and stretches  to the crossroad between the DN1 and Sibiu, between the highest peaks in the country, Moldoveanu and Negoiu. The road, built in the early 1970s as a strategic military route, connects the historic regions of Transylvania and Wallachia.

History 
The Transfăgărășan was constructed between 1970 and 1974 during the rule of Nicolae Ceaușescu as a response to the 1968 invasion of Czechoslovakia by the Soviet Union. Ceaușescu wanted to ensure quick military access across the mountains in case of a Soviet invasion. At the time, Romania already had several strategic mountain passes through the Southern Carpathians, whether inherited from the pre-communist era (the DN1 and the high-pass DN67C) or built during the initial years of the Communist regime (the DN66). These passes, however, were mainly through river valleys, and would be easy for the Soviets to block and attack. Ceaușescu therefore ordered the construction of a road across the Făgăraș Mountains, which divide northwestern and southern Romania.

Built mainly by military forces, the road had a high financial and human cost. Many workers died; official records state that only 40 soldiers lost their lives, but unofficial estimates by workers put the number in the hundreds.

The road was officially opened on 20 September 1974, although work, particularly paving of the roadbed, continued until 1980.

Route
It is a winding road, dotted with steep hairpin turns, long S-curves, and sharp descents. It is both an attraction and a challenge for hikers, cyclists, drivers and motorcycle enthusiasts. The road also provides access to Bâlea Lake and Bâlea Waterfall.

The road is usually closed from late October until late June because of snow. Depending on the weather, it may remain open until as late as November, or may close even in the summer; signs at the town of Curtea de Argeș and the village of Cartisoara provide information.

The Transfăgărășan has more tunnels (a total of 5) and viaducts than any other road in Romania.

Along the southern section of the road, near the village of Arefu, is Poenari Castle. The castle was the residence of Vlad the Impaler, the inspiration for Bram Stoker's Count Dracula.

The northern section is used for annual cycling competitions, including the Tour of Romania, and the  section to Bâlea Lake has been used since 2011 for the Sibiu Cycling Tour. These sections are considered to be similar in difficulty to hors catégorie climbs in the Tour de France.

Cultural references
The Transfăgărășan was featured in a segment of the British TV show Top Gear, in the first episode of Series 14 (November 2009). Host Jeremy Clarkson proclaimed that the Transfăgărășan was "the best road in the world," a title the presenters had previously given to the Stelvio Pass in Italy.

The road has also been dubbed "Ceaușescu's Folly".
In 2022, it was featured in The Misadventures of Romesh Ranganathan.

Gallery

See also
 List of highest paved roads in Europe
 List of mountain passes
 Seven Wonders of Romania
 Trollstigen
 Tourism in Romania

References

External links 

 Map sources for the summit: 
 Official Site (in Romanian)
 Transfăgărășan Photo Gallery
 Riding a Motorcycle on the Transfagarasan
 Transfagarasan Road 

Roads in Romania
Sibiu County
Argeș County
Mountain passes of Romania